Casey Scheuerell is an American jazz, rock and new-age drummer and percussionist.

Scheuerell lived in Sun Prairie, Wisconsin in the 1970s. He has toured internationally with several musicians.

Discography
 A Pauper in Paradise (Gino Vannelli - 1977)
 Cosmic Messenger (Jean-Luc Ponty - 1978)
 Live (Jean-Luc Ponty album) (Jean-Luc Ponty - 1979)
 A Taste for Passion (Jean-Luc Ponty - 1979)
 What Cha' Gonna Do for Me - "And the Melody Still Lingers (Night in Tunisia)" (Chaka Khan - 1981)
 Gino Vannelli (Gino Vannelli - 1982)
 The Music (Sheree Brown - 1982)
 Clics modernos (Charly García - 1983)
 Open Mind (Jean-Luc Ponty - 1984)
 Kitarō: Live in America (Kitarō - 1991)
 Across a Rainbow Sea (Steve Kindler - 1992)
 The Show Must Go On: The Anthology (Leo Sayer - 1996)
 Red Heat (Vaya) (Jimmy Haslip 2000)

Drum Method
 Stickings and Orchestrations for Drum Set (Casey Scheuerell)

References

External links
Discography, album releases & credits at Discogs.

Living people
Year of birth missing (living people)
American jazz drummers
People from Sun Prairie, Wisconsin
American rock drummers